Peter Frederick Morris  (born 29 July 1932) is a former Australian politician.

Morris was born in Sydney and was an alderman on the Newcastle City Council from 1968 to 1974.  He won the House of Representatives seat of Shortland in 1972. He was appointed Minister for Transport in the first Hawke Ministry in March 1983.  In December 1984, he assumed the additional portfolio of aviation.  In 1987, he became Minister for Resources and then was briefly Minister for Housing and Aged Care in early 1988.  In February 1988, he became Minister for Transport and Communications Support, but was appointed to Cabinet as Minister for Industrial Relations in September 1988. After the 1990 election he was not re-elected to the ministry, due to the formalisation of Labor's faction system and the fact that he did not belong to a faction.

Morris did not stand for re-election at the 1998 election.  Allan Morris, Member of the House of Representatives for the neighbouring seat of Newcastle from 1983 to 2001, is his younger brother. Matthew Morris, the former member for Charlestown in the New South Wales Parliament, is his son.

Notes

1932 births
Living people
Members of the Cabinet of Australia
Australian Labor Party members of the Parliament of Australia
Members of the Australian House of Representatives for Shortland
Recipients of the Medal of the Order of Australia
Recipients of the Centenary Medal
People educated at Newcastle Boys' High School
20th-century Australian politicians
Government ministers of Australia